Quebrada Honda is a district of the Nicoya canton, in the Guanacaste province of Costa Rica.

History 
Quebrada Honda was created on 11 July 1967 by Decreto 12. Segregated from Mansión.

Geography 
Quebrada Honda has an area of  km² and an elevation of  metres.

Locations
Barrios: Tortuguero
 Poblados: Botija, Caballito, Embarcadero, Copal, Loma Bonita, Millal, Paraíso, Paso Guabo, Pochote, Puerto Moreno, Roblar, San Juan (part), Sombrero, Sonzapote, Tres Esquinas

Demographics 

For the 2011 census, Quebrada Honda had a population of  inhabitants.

Transportation

Road transportation 
The district is covered by the following road routes:
 National Route 18
 National Route 907

References 

Districts of Guanacaste Province
Populated places in Guanacaste Province